Paul Althaus Smith (May 18, 1900June 13, 1980) was an American mathematician. His name occurs in two significant conjectures in geometric topology: the Smith conjecture, which is now a theorem, and the Hilbert–Smith conjecture, which was proved in dimension 3 in 2013. Smith theory is a theory about homeomorphisms of finite order of manifolds, particularly spheres.

Smith was a student of Solomon Lefschetz at the University of Kansas, moving to Princeton University with Lefschetz in the mid-1920s. He finished his doctorate at Princeton, in 1926.  His Ph.D.  thesis was published in the Annals of Mathematics that same year.  He also worked with George David Birkhoff, with whom he wrote a 1928 paper in ergodic theory, entitled Structure analysis of surface transformations, which appeared in the Journal des Mathématiques.

He subsequently became a professor at Columbia University and at  Barnard College. His students at Columbia included Sherman K. Stein and Moses Richardson. He has many academic descendants through Richardson and his student Louis Billera.

Family
Smith was married to a Swiss–American early music pioneer, Suzanne Bloch.

External links
Approximation of curves and surfaces by algebraic curves and surfaces, Annals of Mathematics, 2nd Ser., Vol. 27, No. 3 (Mar., 1926), pp. 224–244.

1900 births
1980 deaths
20th-century American mathematicians
Topologists
Columbia University faculty
Princeton University alumni